XSH or xsh may refer to:

 XSH, the IATA code for Saint-Pierre-des-Corps station, Centre-Val de Loire, France
 XSH, the Pinyin code for Xushui railway station, Baoding, Hebei, China
 xsh, the ISO 639-3 code for Shamang language, Nigeria